The brown garden eel (Heteroconger longissimus), also known simply as the garden eel, is an eel in the family Congridae (conger/garden eels). It was described by Albert Günther in 1870. It is a tropical, marine eel which is known from the eastern and western Atlantic Ocean, including Madeira, the Canary Islands, Senegal, the Bahamas, the Florida Keys, the Caribbean, Mexico, Belize, Honduras, and Brazil. It dwells at a depth  of 10–60 m, most commonly between 20 and 60 m, and leads a nonmigratory, benthic lifestyle, inhabiting reefs in colonies. They likely spawn during the warm season. The larval state of development lasts for about 6–8 months.

The brown garden eel's diet consists primarily of detritus and plankton.

References

External links

brown garden eel
Fish of the Atlantic Ocean
brown garden eel
Taxa named by Albert Günther